Igor Vladimirovich Talkov (4 November 1956 – 6 October 1991), was a Soviet Russian rock singer-songwriter and film actor. His breakthrough came in 1987 with the David Tukhmanov-composed song Clean Ponds which was an instant hit. Talkov's lyrics are mostly about love, but also contain social critique of the Soviet regime. He was shot dead in 1991.

Early life and career
Igor Talkov was born in Gretsovka, Tula Oblast, Soviet Union on 4 November 1956. He grew up in Shchyokino. After leaving the army, Talkov started singing in the restaurants of Moscow and Sochi.

Igor Talkov has joined to Electroclub band in 1986. Talkov's breakthrough came in 1987 with the David Tukhmanov-composed song Clean Ponds which was an instant hit. While he is mostly remembered for songs about love and fate, most of his work held a clearly political message against the Soviet regime, calling for change. This is one of the reasons why Talkov was never popular with the Soviet government; even as a performer renowned and loved throughout the whole Soviet Union, he lived in a small two-room apartment with his wife and son, composing his lyrics and music "on top of the washing machine in the bathroom", according to the rumours. He was not satisfied with Perestroika, claiming it to be nothing but the same regime under a different guise. In his post-Perestroika songs, he openly mocked the changes, calling them a ruse. Talkov was an avid reader of pre-revolutionary Russian history, which served as the inspiration for many of his songs. He even guaranteed at his last concert that he was willing to "back up" his lyrics with historical facts.

Talkov also made a brief presence in the cinema, acting in the films Behind the Last Line  and Tsar Ivan the Terrible . The latter film he disliked, apologizing to a preview audience for participating in the film. Since Talkov refused to complete post-production sound on the film, his character was voiced by another actor. 

Talkov's songs also have much in common – particularly from a lyrical perspective – with Russian bard music.

Death
According to Talkov's wife Tatyana and son Igor Jr., the last months of the singer's life he received threats.

Many performers performed at the concert, which took place on 6 October 1991 in St. Petersburg at the Yubileiny Sports Palace. A friend of the singer 
Aziza, at her request, asked Igor Talkov to perform first, since Aziza did not have time to prepare for the exit. Talkov called the singer's guard Igor Malakhov to his dressing room, and a verbal conflict occurred between them. After that, two guards Igor Talkov took Igor Malakhov out of the dressing room. Talkov began to prepare for his performance, but a few minutes later the administrator of his Lifebuoy group, Valery Shlyafman, ran up to him, shouting that Malakhov had taken out a revolver. Talkov pulled out a gas pistol from his bag, which he had acquired for self-defense, ran into the corridor and, seeing that his guards were at gunpoint of Igor Malakhov, fired three shots at him. Malakhov bent down, and the guards, taking advantage of this delay, began to neutralize him. Then he fired two shots, but one bullet hit the floor, and the second - into the box with the equipment. The guards began to beat the shooter, and, covering his head, he dropped his revolver. A few moments later, another shot rang out, which hit Igor Talkov in the chest. An hour later, when the ambulance team arrived, the doctors immediately stated biological death.

The prosecutor's office opened a criminal case. Igor Malakhov, who was put on the all-Union wanted list, voluntarily came to confess 10 days later. In December 1991, the charge of premeditated murder was dropped. After conducting examinations in April 1992, the investigation established that the last shot was made by Valery Schlyafman, Talkov's one time manager. However, in February 1992, the defendant left for Israel, with which Russia did not have an extradition agreement at the time, and the murder case was suspended. In November 2018, the Investigative Committee resumed its investigation into the singer's murder.

Aftermath
While Valery Schlyafman  was suspected of the murder by a Russian court in 1992, he fled through Ukraine to Israel before he could be arrested. He remains in Israel to this day, insisting he is not guilty of the crime while Israel refuses to extradite him. Schlyafman and his supporters have claimed that the KGB orchestrated the murder. 

In 1999 Talkov was honoured with his image portrayed on a Russian postage stamp. There is an Igor Talkov Museum in Moscow.

Popular Songs
  Clean Ponds
 Summer Rain (Летний дождь)
  Russia (Россия)
 My Love (Моя любовь)
 Ex-Podesaul (Бывший подъесаул)
  At Your Window  (У твоего окна)
  My Homeland   (Родина моя)
  KPSS  (КПСС)
  Scene   (Сцена)
  Memory   (Память) 
  An Exemplary Boy   (Примерный мальчик)
  Stop! I Think to Myself   (Стоп! Думаю себе)
  Kremlin Wall   (Кремлёвская стена) 
  The Lifebuoy   (Спасательный круг)
  Gentlemen Democrats   (Господа демократы)
  Mr. President  (Господин президент)
 I'll Be Back   (Я вернусь)

See also
List of unsolved murders

References

External links
 

1956 births
1991 deaths
20th-century Russian male singers
20th-century Russian poets
20th-century Russian male writers
20th-century Russian singers
Burials at Vagankovo Cemetery
Deaths by firearm in Russia
Male murder victims
Russian chanson
Russian male poets
Russian male singer-songwriters
Russian murder victims
Russian people of German descent
Russian rock singers
Soviet dissidents
Soviet male singer-songwriters
Unsolved murders in Russia